Samuel Lazzaro (August 6, 1903 – March 31, 1982), better known by his boxing alias Joe Dundee, was an American boxer. He was the brother of Middleweight Champion Vince Dundee. During his career, he was recognized as the World Welterweight Champion from 1927-9.  Dundee's managers included Max Waxman, and Charles Johnston, and his trainer was Heinie Blaustein. He was the older brother of former middleweight world champion of boxing, Vince Dundee.

Early life and career
Dundee was born Samuel Lazzaro in Palermo, Sicily, Italy on August 16, 1903.  He was tutored at St. Mary's Industrial School in Baltimore, where his family moved when he was a young boy.  

Dundee began professional boxing in 1919 in Baltimore, In an important early career loss, Dundee was disqualified in a match with former world bantamweight champion Kid Williams on September 4, 1922 in Baltimore, Maryland.  Williams was leading by a large margin when the bout was called, excelling in the infighting, and landing nearly every blow imaginable against Dundee. Nearly a month later, Dundee married Johanna Kozojet at St. Wenceslaus Church.  

One of his most noteworthy bouts was a ten round draw by decision with Lew Tendler before 10,000 on July 16, 1925 at Pennsylvania's Shibe Park.  In a close and furiously fought bout in the rain, Dundee caught Tendler off balance in the ninth with a left hook, and he fell briefly to his hands.  Dundee frequently fought on offense against Tendler, staggering him at times with a stunning right.  The skilled ring veteran Tendler was forced to clinch at times.  

Tommy Freeman fell to Dundee on March 1, 1926 in a fifth round technical knockout at Madison Square Garden, furthering Dundee's rise to the top of the welterweight ranks.  

He defeated Jewish Brooklyn-based boxer George Levine in a ten round points decision at Madison Square Garden on May 8, 1926.  The fight was action packed from the beginning, though there were no knockdowns. Levine scored well and kept Dundee at a distance with a left jab in the first four rounds, while Dundee went to the body in the fifth with his right and wore down his opponent in the remaining rounds.  Reporters recognized Dundee as a top two contender for the welterweight title and Self Defense magazine rated Levine in the top ten for welterweights that year.  

Dundee decisively defeated former world welterweight champion Mickey Walker on June 24, 1926 in an eighth round technical knockout before 15,000 at New York's Madison Square Garden.  Walker was battered throughout the bout, and was able to lead the only in the first, which he may have won on points. Dundee aimed frequently at an injured eye, which Walker had gotten in training prior to the match.  The referee stopped the bout 2:53 into the eighth when bleeding from Walker's injured eye and the battering he had taken made it impossible for him to continue.  The win against Walker spotlighted Dundee's ascension to the top ranks of welterweight contenders.

In an important early career win, Dundee defeated Jack Zivic in a ten round points decision on October 15, 1926 before a crowd of 12,000 at Madison Square Garden.  Dundee was given seven rounds, with two to Zivic, and one even.  Dundee boxed carefully against a well known opponent, delivering hard rights to the body, and left hooks to the jaw.  He fought through the frequent clinches of Zivic, and fought in close when necessary on the breaks.   

Eddie Roberts fell to Dundee in a decisive ten round unanimous decision on January 14, 1927 before a crowd of 18,000 at Madison Square Garden.  Roberts took frequent blows to the body that exhausted him, and helped give Dundee an edge.  Dundee was down briefly in the fourth from a right cross and may have been close to a knockout, but recovered and fought back gamely in the remaining rounds.  The Associated Press gave Dundee eight rounds and Roberts two.  In a previous match on December 4, 1926, Dundee lost in a first round technical knockout to Roberts after he was floored four times in the first.

Taking the world welterweight title, June, 1927

Dundee defeated Pete Latzo for the world welterweight title on June 3, 1927, at New York's Polo Grounds, winning in a fifteen round majority decision before one of his largest audiences, an impressive crowd of 30,000.  In a fairly decisive win, the Associated Press gave Dundee ten of the fifteen rounds, building his largest points margin in the later rounds.  Latzo started strong, looking best in the first, second, fourth, and twelfth, but took brutal body punishment, particularly to the kidneys, through much of the bout.  By the tenth, gaining confidence and sensing victory, Dundee went to Latzo's head as well as his body with greater frequency.  Several reporters attributed Latzo's lack of endurance in the later rounds to his difficulty making the 147 pound welterweight limit. 

Dundee fought a peculiar bout with former world light welterweight champion Pinky Mitchell on August 11, 1927 in Milwaukee that was declared a No Contest, and discontinued in the sixth round for stalling.  The Wisconsin Boxing Commission barred both boxers from competing in their state until January 1, 1928.  Though warned against the continuous holding and clinching for five rounds, both competitors persisted until the referee ended the contest before a booing crowd of 5,000.  What little fighting there was appeared to leave the fighters on even terms.

Dundee lost to future welterweight champion Jack Thompson on August 30, 1928 in a second round technical knockout at Chicago's Comiskey Park.  Though the first appeared even, in the second, Dundee was down first for a count of nine from a right cross, and again for a nine count from a flurry of punches before the referee stopped the bout.  Thompson would have taken the title due to the knockout, but for a weight discrepancy during the weigh-in, which removed the bout from title contention.

Loss of the world welterweight title, July, 1929
On March 21, 1929, Dundee was stripped of his NBA world welterweight title for refusing to fight top contenders Jack Thompson or Jackie Fields.  He was not considered to have fully lost the title until his bout with Jackie Fields.

On July 25, 1929 Dundee faced Jackie Fields before a crowd of 25,000 in a unifying match for the welterweight championship in Detroit, and a chance to reclaim his title. Fields was awarded the fight in the second round after Dundee, having been knocked down four times, delivered a foul blow while still down which left put fields down on the mat in pain, and incapable of continuing the fight. Dundee claimed that the foul was unintentional but some boxing historians has since speculated otherwise, even considering it part of a fix. Fields stated he believed Dundee, but noted that it was the only bout he had ever won on a foul.  The win gave Fields unified recognition as world welterweight champion.

Taking the Mexican welterweight title, October, 1929
Dundee defeated Bert Colima on October 13, 1929 for the Mexican welterweight title in a ten round points decision in Mexico City before an exceptional crowd of 20,000.  Dundee was down for a count of nine in the second, and Colima was down twice in the sixth, once for a count of eight.  Dundee dominated the later rounds, but could not find a knockout punch.

In one of his last career fights on May 28, 1930, Dundee decisively defeated British lightweight champion Harry Mason in a ten round points decision at Madison Square Garden before a modest crowd of 5,000.  Though Dundee appeared close to being knocked out in the first round, he rallied in the remaining rounds to gain the decision from Mason. 

After retiring from boxing around 1931, Dundee worked as a bartender in Baltimore in a tavern in which he had partial ownership.

Dundee was inducted into the Maryland State Athletic Hall of Fame in 1959.  He died on March 31, 1982, at Manor Care Townsend Nursing Home in Baltimore, and was buried in The Most Holy Redeemer Cemetery.  He left a wife, Johanna, and three sons.

Professional boxing record
All information in this section is derived from BoxRec, unless otherwise stated.

Official record

All newspaper decisions are officially regarded as “no decision” bouts and are not counted in the win/loss/draw column.

Unofficial record

Record with the inclusion of newspaper decisions to the win/loss/draw column.

See also
List of welterweight boxing champions

References

External links
 
 https://boxrec.com/media/index.php/The_Ring_Magazine%27s_Annual_Ratings:_Welterweight--1920s

|-

 

1903 births
1982 deaths
Italian emigrants to the United States
Welterweight boxers
World welterweight boxing champions
American people of Italian descent
Italian male boxers
American male boxers
Sportspeople from Palermo
Boxers from Baltimore